Marion Bay may refer to:

 Marion Bay, South Australia, a locality
 Marion Bay, Tasmania
 Marion Bay Important Bird Area

See also
Marion (disambiguation)